Michael Saba (born c. 1941) was a Democratic member of the South Dakota House of Representatives, representing District 9. He was elected November 6, 2018, when he placed second in a three-way race for two legislative seats against Republican candidates Deb Peters and Michael Clark, narrowly defeating Clark by 67 votes.

Saba served one term of office, and was defeated in the November 3, 2020, election by Republicans Rhonda Milstead and Bethany Soye.

After graduating from Minot State in 1965 with degrees in biology and teacher education, he joined the Peace Corps which was then newly formed by John F. Kennedy. His father is from Lebanon, and Saba was the executive director of the National Association of Arab-Americans in the early 1970s. While working in the Middle East as a liaison for Western oil companies and local governments, Saba was in Baghdad during the run up to the Gulf War and was, along with a number of other westerners, prevented from leaving the country by the Iraqi government. After a ten-day detainment at a hotel, he and another hostage hired a taxi and escaped in an eight-hour ride to the Jordanian border.

He is the author of The Armageddon Network.

References 

Year of birth missing (living people)
Living people
Members of the South Dakota House of Representatives
Peace Corps volunteers
1940s births
21st-century American politicians